Pavlopil is a village in Mariupol Raion (district) in Donetsk Oblast of eastern Ukraine, at about 25 km NW from Novoazovsk and about 25 km NE from Mariupol, on the left bank of the Kalmius river.

The conflict between Ukraine and pro-Russian forces, that started in April 2014, has brought along both civilian and military casualties.

In May 2016, a male civilian was killed and another injured when a tractor they were driving on hit an unidentified explosive device.

Demographics
Native language as of the Ukrainian Census of 2001:
 Ukrainian – 72.60%
 Russian – 26.28%
 Armenian – 0.32%

References

External links

 OSCE Special Monitoring Mission to Ukraine (SMM) Daily Report 25/2022 issued on 3 February 2022
 Weather forecast for Pavlopil

Villages in Mariupol Raion